The Europe/Africa Zone was one of the three zones of the regional Davis Cup competition in 1992.

In the Europe/Africa Zone there were three different tiers, called groups, in which teams competed against each other to advance to the upper tier.

Group I

Winners in Group I advanced to the World Group Qualifying Round, along with losing teams from the World Group first round. Teams who lost in the first round competed in the relegation play-offs, with winning teams remaining in Group I, whereas teams who lost their play-offs were relegated to the Europe/Africa Zone Group II in 1993.

Participating nations

Draw

Group II

Winners in Group II advanced to the Europe/Africa Zone Group I. Teams who lost their respective ties competed in the relegation play-offs, with winning teams remaining in Group II, whereas teams who lost their play-offs were relegated to the Europe/Africa Zone Group III in 1993.

Participating nations

Draw

Group III

Winners in Group III advanced to the Europe/Africa Zone Group II in 1993. All other teams remained in Group III.

Participating countries

Draw

References

External links
Davis Cup official website

Davis Cup Europe/Africa Zone
Europe Africa Zone